Petr Hošek, also known by the stage names Blackie and Blackosh, is one of the founding members of Czech black metal group Root. He left Root after the recording of Madness of the Graves (2003). He also has some other musical side projects such as Cales and Blackosh. As of 2017 he is also a member of Master's Hammer, having previously collaborated with the band as a session member on their 2012 album Vracejte konve na místo.. His first album as an official member of the band, Fascinator, came out on 10 February 2018. As of early 2019, he is also a member of Nifelheim as their guitarist.

Biography of Cales 
CALES is another, but main project of Blackie that was founded in 1992 when Blackie (guitar) got together with Evil (drums) recorded two songs "The First Key" and "The Second Key" for compilation called "Necrometal". The debut album "Bonds Of Togetherness" was released in 1997 on Tentamen Records (re-released in 2004 year by Open Media Records). Songs were sung by DeSed (Dark, Dark Gamballe). Since then, Cales has gone on to record and release a handful of other albums including "The Pass in Time" in 2001, "Uncommon Excursion" in  2003, "Savage Blood" in 2007, "KRF" in 2009, and the most recent album "Return from the Other Side" in 2011. The overall music of Cales is melodic pagan folk metal with elements of doom metal, rock, and ethnic music. The lyrics contain themes concerning magic, nature, spiritualism, and is influenced by Celtic culture and symbolism. The only album in Cales discography that somewhat deviated from the usual pagan folk metal style and lyrical themes was "Uncommon Excursion" since it was much more in the style of melodic rock with themes/lyrics about life, personal struggles, partying,  rock n' roll, and so forth. The overall music of Cales is primarily about creating atmosphere, emotion and mood. Since 2012, there has been no new activity or updates from Cales and the current status of the project and its future is uncertain. According to a recent interview with Petr from February 2019, the project may be on hold or possibly discontinued in the future since he feels that all of the existing Cales albums are enough for now, but time will tell.

Discography

With Root

With Cales

With Entrails

With Master's Hammer

With Blackosh

References

External links 
 Cales homepage
 Entrails entry in Encyclopaedia Metallum

Year of birth missing (living people)
Heavy metal guitarists
Czech guitarists
Male guitarists
Living people